George Richard Uniacke Harman (6 June 1874 – 14 December 1975) was an Irish cricketer and rugby union player. 

Harman was born in Crosshaven, County Cork, Ireland. A right-handed batsman, he played one first-class match for Dublin University against the MCC in May 1895. He is one of only 22 first-class cricketers to live to the age of 100. He was much more successful as a Rugby Union player, representing Ireland twice in the 1899 Home Nations Championship, playing against England and Wales. His brother William Harman played one first-class match for Ireland in 1907. He died in Cornwall, England, in December 1975, aged 100.

See also
 List of Irish cricket and rugby union players

References

External links
Cricket Archive profile
Cricinfo profile

1874 births
1975 deaths
Irish centenarians
Men centenarians
Irish cricketers
Dublin University cricketers
Irish rugby union players
Ireland international rugby union players
Cricketers from County Cork
Rugby union players from County Cork